Jo Seong-Joon  (Hangul: 조성준; born 7 June 1988) is a South Korean footballer who plays as midfielder.

External links 

1988 births
Living people
South Korean footballers
Jeonbuk Hyundai Motors players
K League 1 players
K3 League players
Association football midfielders